SEQ or seq may refer to:

 Sequence (disambiguation), a word commonly abbreviated as "seq."
 South East Queensland, a place in Australia
Seq, Iran, a village in Hormozgan Province, Iran
 SEQ, the former callsign of a TV station in Maryborough, Queensland, Australia
 ShowEQ, a protocol analyzer for the video game, EverQuest.
 seq (Unix), a program in the GNU Core Utilities and Plan 9 from Bell Labs that outputs a sequence of numbers
Schrödinger equation, a defining equation of quantum mechanics